Dowlatabad Rural District is in the Central District of Namin County, Ardabil province, Iran. At the census of 2006, its population was 5,895 in 1,310 households; there were 6,199 inhabitants in 1,711 households at the following census of 2011; and in the most recent census of 2016, the population of the rural district was 5,365 in 1,500 households. The largest of its 13 villages was Dowlatabad, with 1,587 people.

References 

Namin County

Rural Districts of Ardabil Province

Populated places in Ardabil Province

Populated places in Namin County